Rikke Rønholt (born 1 January 1976) is a Danish athlete. She is a part of Sparta Athletics team. She started doing athletics when she was 12 years old. Back then she participated in events from 60 metres to heptathlon and shot put. When she ran her first 400 metres hurdles she was less than a second from qualifying for the European Junior Championships. She represents Sparta.

She competed at the 1997 World Championships, the European Championships in 2002 and 2006 and the European Indoor Championships in 2005 and 2007.

Records
Danish senior records:  
 400 metres  52.84 s 
 400 metres hurdles (76,2 cm)  57.04 s 
 4 x 400 metres 3:38,65 min. 23-06-2001  
 
Danish senior records indoor:  
 400 metres  54.71 s   
    
Danish U-23 records: 
 400 metres  54.22 s 
 400 metres hurdles (76,2 cm)  57.04 s

Danish junior records: 
 400 metres  54.75 s    
 400 metres hurdles (76,2 cm)  57.71 s

References

1976 births
Living people
Danish heptathletes
Danish female shot putters
Danish female sprinters
Danish female hurdlers